The third government of Francisco Franco was formed on 20 July 1945, following the end of World War II in Europe.

Franco's third cabinet was made up of members from the different factions or "families" within the National Movement: mainly the FET y de las JONS party—the only legal political party during the Francoist regime—the military, the National Catholic Association of Propagandists (ACNP) and a number of aligned-nonpartisan figures from the civil service.

Council of Ministers
The Council of Ministers was structured into the office for the prime minister and 12 ministries.

Departmental structure
Francisco Franco's third government was organised into several superior and governing units, whose number, powers and hierarchical structure varied depending on the ministerial department.

Unit/body rank
() Undersecretary
() Director-general
() Military & intelligence agency

Notes

References

Bibliography

External links
Governments. Dictatorship of Franco (18.07.1936 / 20.11.1975). CCHS–CSIC (in Spanish).
Governments of Franco. Dictatorship Chronology (1939–1975). Fuenterrebollo Portal (in Spanish).
The governments of the Civil War and Franco's dictatorship (1936–1975). Lluís Belenes i Rodríguez History Page (in Spanish).
Biographies. Royal Academy of History (in Spanish).

1945 establishments in Spain
1951 disestablishments in Spain
Cabinets established in 1945
Cabinets disestablished in 1951
Council of Ministers (Spain)